George Edward Cole, OBE (22 April 1925 – 5 August 2015) was an English actor whose career spanned 75 years. He was best known for playing Arthur Daley in the long-running ITV comedy-drama show Minder and Flash Harry in the early St Trinian's films.

Early life
Cole was born in Tooting, London. He was placed for adoption at ten days of age and adopted by George and Florence Cole, a Tooting council employee and charwoman (cleaner) respectively. He attended secondary school in nearby Morden. He left school at 14 to be a butcher's boy and had an ambition to join the Merchant Navy but landed a part in a touring musical and chose acting as a career. He recalled during that year (1939) he was in Dublin on the day of Britain's entry into World War II when he witnessed an effigy of Neville Chamberlain being publicly burned without interference from the local police.

Career
Aged 15, Cole was cast in the film Cottage to Let (1941) opposite Scottish actor Alastair Sim. Sim liked Cole, and agreed with his family to take in Cole and his mother to their home. Acting as his mentor, Sim helped Cole lose his Cockney accent; Cole stayed with the Sim family until he was 27. He later attributed his career success to Sim, with whom he appeared in a total of 11 films, ending with a filmed version for television of The Anatomist (1956), from the play by James Bridie. Cole also acted opposite Laurence Olivier in The Demi-Paradise (1943) and Olivier's film version of Henry V (1944), of which he was the last surviving cast member. His career was interrupted by his national service in the Royal Air Force from 1944 to 1947, where he was temporarily a radio operator.

Returning to his acting career, he became familiar to audiences in British comedy films in the 1950s. Cole appeared with Alastair Sim in Scrooge (as the young Scrooge) in 1951, including a scene with fellow actor Patrick Macnee who played the young Jacob Marley. His best known film role was as "Flash Harry" in the St Trinian's films (two of which also star Sim), and in the comedy Too Many Crooks (1959). He also starred in the film Take Me High (1973) alongside Cliff Richard and Deborah Watling. Cole was also known for his lead role in the radio comedy A Life of Bliss (1953–69), in which he played an amiable but bumbling bachelor, David Alexander Bliss, (initially played by David Tomlinson); it lasted for six series and 118 episodes. It became a TV series in 1960, running for two series, but no recordings of the TV episodes are known to survive.

The Scarecrow of Romney Marsh (1963) is a three-part serial which formed part of the Walt Disney's Wonderful World of Color TV series. It was shot on location in England and stars Patrick McGoohan as Doctor Syn, with Cole as Mipps.

In 1964, Cole guest-starred as 'Bishop', an increasingly deranged arsonist, in the episode "Firebug" in the ITV series Gideon's Way. In 1968, he starred as Max Osborne in the TV series A Man of Our Times.

Cole appeared as a guest star in the Gerry Anderson-produced television series UFO in the episode "Flight Path" (1971), and he appeared as a storyteller on the BBC children's programme Jackanory, narrating in six episodes between 1969 and 1971. He also made a guest appearance as Mr Downs, a bank manager, in a 1978 episode of the sitcom The Good Life, performed in the presence of Queen Elizabeth II.

His best-remembered television role was as the crafty wheeler-dealer Arthur Daley in the popular and successful Thames Television series Minder, which he played from 1979 to the show's conclusion in 1994. Prior to this, he had played a struggling writer in the BBC sitcom Don't Forget To Write! (1977–79).
Although he is most associated with the character of Arthur Daley, it was one which produced mixed emotions in him, describing variously his support for the character as well as citing in his autobiography how much he loathed the type of person Daley was.

Cole also played Sir Giles Lynchwood in the BBC's adaptation of the Tom Sharpe novel Blott on the Landscape (1985). Cole starred in a number of comedies, such as The Bounder (1982–83), Comrade Dad (1984–86), Dad (1997–99) and My Good Friend (1995–96).

Cole appeared in a New Tricks (BBC), series 4 Episode 5 "Powerhouse" (2007) and the Midsomer Murders episode "Shot at Dawn" (2008).

Personal life
Cole was married twice, first to actress Eileen Moore (b.1932) from 1954 until 1962 (when they divorced), and then to actress Penny Morrell (1967–2015, his death). Cole had four children, two from each marriage. His son from his first marriage, Cris Cole, is a screenwriter for film and television.

He was invested as an Officer of the Order of the British Empire (OBE) in 1992. He resided for over 70 years in Stoke Row, Oxfordshire. His autobiography The World Was My Lobster, a phrase taken from an episode of Minder that made George smile, was published in 2013.

Death

Cole died at the age of 90 on 5 August 2015 at the Royal Berkshire Hospital in Reading, Berkshire, after a short illness. His funeral took place at Reading Crematorium on 13 August. The Minder theme song was played and Cole's Minder co-star Dennis Waterman gave a eulogy.

Partial filmography

 Cottage to Let (1941) – Ronald
 Those Kids from Town (1942) – Charlie
 The Demi-Paradise (1943) – Percy (uncredited)
 Henry V (1944) – Boy
 Journey Together (1945) – Curley, Bomb Aimer, Lancaster Crew
 My Brother's Keeper (1948) – Willie Stannard
 Quartet (1948) – Herbert Sunbury (segment "The Kite")
 The Spider and the Fly (1949) – Marc, detective
 Morning Departure (1950) – E.R.A. Marks
 The Happiest Days of Your Life (1950) – Junior Assistant Caretaker at Ministry of Education (uncredited)
 Gone to Earth (US: The Wild Heart, 1950) – Cousin Albert
 Flesh and Blood (1951) – John Hannah
 Laughter in Paradise (1951) – Herbert Russell
 Lady Godiva Rides Again (1951) – Johnny
 Scrooge (1951) – Young Ebenezer Scrooge
 The Happy Family (1952) – Cyril
 Who Goes There! (1952) – Arthur Crisp
 Top Secret (1952) – George
 Folly to Be Wise (1953) – Soldier in Brains Trust audience (uncredited)
 Will Any Gentleman...? (1953) – Henry Sterling
 The Intruder (1953) – John Summers
 The Clue of the Missing Ape (1953) – Gobo
 Our Girl Friday (1953) – Jimmy Carrol
 An Inspector Calls (1954) – Tram Conductor (uncredited)
 Happy Ever After (1954) – Terence
 The Belles of St. Trinian's (1954) – Flash Harry
 A Prize of Gold (1955) – Sergeant Roger Morris
 Where There's a Will (1955) – Fred Slater
 The Constant Husband (1955) – Luigi Sopranelli
 The Adventures of Quentin Durward (1955) – Hayraddin
 It's a Wonderful World (1956) – Ken Millar
 The Weapon (1956) – Joshua Henry
 The Green Man (1956) – William Blake
 Blue Murder at St Trinian's (1957) – 'Flash' Harry
 Too Many Crooks (1959) – Fingers
 The Bridal Path (1959) – Police Sgt. Bruce
 Don't Panic Chaps! (1959) – Finch
 The Pure Hell of St Trinian's (1960) – 'Flash' Harry Cuthbert Edwards
 Cleopatra (1963) – Flavius
 Dr. Syn, Alias the Scarecrow (1963) – Mr. Sexton Mipps / Hellspite
 One Way Pendulum (1964) – Defence Counsel / Fred
 Gideon's Way, episode "The Firebug" (1964) – Arsonist / Bishop
 The Great St Trinian's Train Robbery (1966) – 'Flash' Harry
 The Caramel Crisis (1966) – Caramel
 The Vampire Lovers (1970) – Roger Morton
 UFO (episode 15 – Flight Path) (1971, TV Series)
 Fright (1971) – Jim
 Take Me High (1973) – Bert Jackson
 Gone in Sixty Seconds (1974)
- Atlee Jackson
 The Blue Bird (1976) – Tylo
 The Sweeney (1976) – Dennis Longfield
 Double Nickels (1977) – George
 Don't Forget to Write! (1977–1979, TV Series) – George Maple
 Minder (1979–1994, TV Series) – Arthur Daley
 Minder on the Orient Express (TV 1985) – Arthur Daley
 An Officer and a Car Salesman (Minder spin off) (1988, TV Series) – Arthur Daley
 Deadline Auto Theft (1983) – Atlee Jackson
 Blott on the Landscape (1985, TV Series) – Sir Giles Lynchwood / Sir Giles
 Comrade Dad (1986, TV Series) - Reg Dudgeon
 Tube Mice (1988, TV Series) – Vernon (Voice)
 Root Into Europe (1992, TV Series) – Henry Root
 My Good Friend (1995–1996, TV Series) – Peter Banks
 Mary Reilly (1996) – Mr. Poole
 Dad (1997–1999, TV Series) – Brian Hook
 The Ghost of Greville Lodge (2000) – Great Uncle
 Heartbeat (2005–2008, TV Series) – Albert Hallows (final appearance)
 Marple (2007) – Laurence Raeburn
 New Tricks (2007} - Sir Edward Chambers
 Midsomer Murders (2008) – Lionel Hicks

References

External links
 
 George Cole at britmovie.co.uk
 George Cole (Aveleyman)
 
 

1925 births
2015 deaths
English male film actors
English male television actors
English male voice actors
English autobiographers
People from Tooting
20th-century English male actors
21st-century English male actors
English adoptees
Royal Air Force personnel of World War II
Officers of the Order of the British Empire
British male comedy actors